The United States Congress routinely passes commemorative legislation. These bills are largely ceremonial, and are designed to honor individuals, groups and causes. According to the Pew Research Center, between the 101st and 115th congress, ceremonial bills made up between 11% to 39% of all enacted federal legislation, depending on the congress.

Since 1967, a popular kind of bill has been naming individual United States Post Offices, which entail the creation of a small plaque with the new name of the post office, and an unveiling ceremony. The post office bills have been criticized for the time required to pass them, but remain a popular, usually uncontroversial kind of bill, sometimes making up a significant portion of federal legislation. Beyond post offices, the United States Congress also passes legislation to officially name other buildings such as Veterans Health Administration clinics, or natural features such as mountain ridges.

Other kinds of commemorative legislation include issuing commemorative coins, awarding the Congressional Gold Medal, and various kinds of observances.

Binding versus non-binding resolutions 

To be legally binding, house bills and senate bills (usually abbreviated H.R. or S.R.) must be signed by both chambers and signed into law by the president. On the other hand, simple resolutions are usually passed as a House Resolution or Senate Resolution (usually abbreviated as H.Res. or S.Res. respectively), and are not forwarded to the other chamber of congress. These simple resolutions are never legally binding, but are often used to signal approval or disapproval.

Some types of congressional observances do not require passing text at all, such as United States Capitol Flag Program.

References

United States federal postal legislation
Ceremonies in the United States